Dawit Yemane (born 1998) is an Eritrean cyclist, who currently rides for UCI Continental team . In 2021, he won the Eritrean National Road Race Championships, and later competed in the road race at the 2021 UCI Road World Championships.

Major results
2017
 3rd Overall Tour of Quanzhou Bay
1st Mountains classification
 7th Overall Tour Eritrea
2018
 2nd Africa Cup
2019
 8th Road race, African Games
2020
 1st  Mountains classification, La Tropicale Amissa Bongo
2021
 National Road Championships
1st  Road race
3rd Time trial
2022
 African Road Championships
1st  Team time trial
2nd  Mixed Relay TTT
4th Time trial
 1st  Overall Tour de Serbie
1st Stage 3
 7th Overall Tour of Turkey
 8th Flèche Ardennaise

References

External links

1998 births
Living people
Eritrean male cyclists
African Games competitors for Eritrea
Competitors at the 2019 African Games